Ambroise Uwiragiye (born 31 December 1980) is a Rwandan long distance runner who specialises in the marathon. He competed in the men's marathon event at the 2016 Summer Olympics where he finished in 99th place with a time of 2:25:57.

References

External links
 

1980 births
Living people
Rwandan male long-distance runners
Rwandan male marathon runners
Place of birth missing (living people)
Athletes (track and field) at the 2016 Summer Olympics
Olympic athletes of Rwanda